Kanakythyris is a monotypic genus of brachiopods belonging to the family Terebratulidae. The only species is Kanakythyris pachyrhynchos.

The species is found in Oceania.

References

Terebratulida
Brachiopod genera
Monotypic brachiopod genera